The 2020 Philadelphia Fusion season was the third season of the Philadelphia Fusion's existence in the Overwatch League and their first under head coach Kim "KDG" Dong-gun. The Fusion planned to host three homestand weekends in the 2020 season, with the first two taking place at The Met in Philadelphia and the third at the Boardwalk Hall in Atlantic City. While their first homestand weekend took place, all following homestand events were canceled due to the COVID-19 pandemic.

On August 16, in their final regular season game, the Fusion clinched the top seed in the North America region for the season playoffs with a win over the San Francisco Shock. In the first round of the North America bracket, Philadelphia swept the Los Angeles Gladiators, 3–0. The following day, the Fusion swept the Los Angeles Valiant, 3–0, sending them to the North America upper bracket finals. In the upper finals match, which took place on September 12, Philadelphia were handed their first lost of the postseason, falling to San Francisco by a score of 1–3. The loss sent the Fusion to the North America lower bracket finals, where they swept the Washington Justice, 3–0, sending them to the Grand Finals bracket.

The Fusion's first match in the Grand Finals bracket was on October 8, where they were swept, 0–3, by the Shanghai Dragons. The following day, they were swept,  0–3, by the Seoul Dynasty, ending their postseason run.

Preceding offseason

Organizational changes 
In September 2019, Director of Overwatch Operations Yann "Kirby" Luu, who was also the head coach of the team in 2018, left the team. Less than a month later, both co-head coaches Se-hwi "NamedHwi" Go and Elliot "Hayes" Hayes announced their departures from the team. The team found their replacement on October 25 with the hiring of former Seoul Dynasty head coach Kim "KDG" Dong-gun. Additionally, the team promoted Roston Yoo from team manager to assistant general manager the same day.

Roster changes 

The Fusion enter the new season with two free agents, four players which they have the option to retain for another year, and three players under contract. The OWL's deadline to exercise a team option is November 11, after which any players not retained will become a free agent. Free agency officially began on October 7.

Acquisitions 
The Fusion's first acquisitions of the offseason were announced on October 30. The team traded tank Shin "BERNAR" Se-won and support Kim "Fuze" Tae-hoon from Fusion University to the London Spitfire in exchange for tank Kim "Fury" Jun-ho, signed former Toronto Defiant DPS Lee "Ivy" Seung-hun, acquired support Daniel "FunnyAstro" Hathaway from the Atlanta Reign, and promoted support Kim "Alarm" Kyeong-bo from Fusion University. Additionally, the team announced that DPS Josue "Eqo" Corona as part of their roster, although he had been let go from the team earlier in the month. On November 25, the team announced that they had acquired DPS Jeong "Heesu" Hee-su from RunAway, although he would not turn 18, and thus ineligible to play, until late March.

On November 26, the acquisition of DPS Philip "ChipSa" Graham, a popular streamer, was announced. This signing proved to be controversial, as several figures in the professional Overwatch community criticized the signing. Namely, Envy Gaming content creator Justin "Jayne" Conroy noted his lack of professional experience and accused the Fusion of nepotism, as ChipSa's brother Chris "ChrisTFer" Graham works as an assistant coach for the team.

Departures 
The Fusion's first free agent to depart from the team was support Alberto "neptuNo" González, who had been with the team since its inception in 2017, as the team announced that they had parted ways with him on October 21. The following day, the team elected not to exercise their option to retain DPS Josue "Eqo" Corona, who was also an inaugural season team member. Support Elijah "Elk" Gallagher and DPS Finley "Kyb" Adisi, the final two players that were under team options, were released a day later. Although he was announced as a part of the Fusion's roster in October, DPS Simon "Snillo" Ekström was released from the team on December 19.

Final roster

Standings

Game log

Regular season 

|2020 season schedule

Midseason tournaments 

| style="text-align:center;" | Bonus wins awarded: 5

Postseason

References 

Philadelphia Fusion
Philadelphia Fusion
Philadelphia Fusion seasons